Bug may refer to:

Common uses 
 A terrestrial arthropod animal (with at least six legs)
 Insect, a six-legged arthropod
Hemiptera, the true bugs, insects with piercing–sucking mouthparts
 Covert listening device, used in surveillance, espionage and policing
 Bug (engineering), a defect in the design, manufacture or operation of machinery, circuitry, electronics, hardware or software 
 Software bug, an error, flaw or fault in computer software 
 Hardware bug, a defect in the design, manufacture or operation of computer hardware
 BUG (tag), a computer programming comment tag

Arts, entertainment and media

Fictional entities
 Bug (comics), a superhero in Marvel comics
 Bug (Starship Troopers), an alien race from the novel and film
 Bug, Michael Lee's younger brother in The Wire
 Bug, in the TV series WordWorld
 Bobby "Bug" Guthrie, in the TV series Life Unexpected

Film and television
 Bug (1975 film), an American horror film
 Bug (2002 film), an American comedy film
 Bug (2006 film), a psychological horror film adaptation of the Tracy Letts play
 Bug, a 2017 film starring Gene Jones
 "Bug" (Breaking Bad), a 2011 TV episode

Gaming
 Bug (poker), a limited form of wild card
 Bug, a Pokémon type
 Bug!, a 1995 video game
 Bughouse chess, or bug, a chess variant played on two boards

Music

Albums
 Bug (Dave Davies album), 2002
 Bug (Dinosaur Jr. album), 1988
 Bug (soundtrack), of the 2006 film

Songs
 "Bug", a song by Feeder from the 2001 album Echo Park
 "Bug", a song by Lower Than Atlantis from the 2011 album World Record
 "Bug", a song by Phish from the 2000 album Farmhouse
 "The Bug", a 1992 song by Dire Straits

Other uses in arts, entertainment and media
 BUG (magazine), a Croatian magazine
 Bug (play), by Tracy Letts, 1993

Businesses and organizations
 Bicycle User Group, a group set up to promote cycling issues

People
 Bug Hall (born 1985), an American actor
 Bug Holliday (1867–1910), an American baseball player
 Bug Howard (born 1994), an American football player
 Enric Bug (born 1957), pseudonym Bug Rogers, a Spanish comic book artist and industrial designer   
 The Bug (musician), a recording alias for British musician Kevin Martin

Places
 Bug (river) or Western Bug, a river in Poland, Ukraine and Belarus
 Southern Bug, Southern Buh or Boh, a river in Ukraine
 Bug (Rügen), a spit and former village on the island of Rügen in Mecklenburg-Western Pomerania, Germany
 Bug, Kentucky, a settlement in Clinton County, Kentucky, in the United States
 Bag, Qasr-e Qand, also called Būg, a village in Sistan and Baluchestan Province, Iran

Science and technology
 Slipper lobster (Scyllaridae), a number of species of which are called "bug"
 Bug, a digital on-screen graphic of a broadcaster's logo
 Bug, a Morse key design by Vibroplex
 Web beacon or web bug, a tracking object embedded in a web page or e-mail

Transportation
 Bond Bug, a British three-wheeled car
 Dudly Bug, an early gas-powered cyclecar 
 Sandlin Bug, an American ultralight glider design
 Volkswagen Beetle, an automobile nicknamed "Bug"
 Bug railway station, in Pakistan
 Bagaha railway station, Bihar, a railway station in India, station code BUG
 Burgess Hill railway station, a railway station in Sussex, England

Other uses
 Buginese language, ISO 639 language code bug
 The Bug (horse) (1943–1963), an Irish-bred Thoroughbred racehorse

See also

 Bugg (disambiguation)
 Bugged (disambiguation)
 Bugs (disambiguation)
 Annoyance, an unpleasant mental state 
 Pathogen, an organism that causes disease
 Dudley Bug, an extinct trilobite
 Debugging, in computer programming and software development
 Union label or union bug, a label marking a product made by union workers